Navarasa kannada or Navarasakannada is a rāgam in Carnatic music (musical scale of South Indian classical music). It is a janya rāgam (derived scale) from the 28th melakarta scale Harikambhoji. This scale is well suited for instrumental music, especially with veena and flute. It is suited for orchestral music as well.

Structure and Lakshana 

Navarasa kannada is an asymmetric rāgam that does not contain rishabham, dhaivatam or nishādham in the ascending scale, while it does not have panchamam in descending scale. It is an svarantara-shadava rāgam (4 notes in ascending scale and 6 in descending scale). Its  structure (ascending and descending scale) is as follows:

 : 
 : 

The notes used in this scale are shadjam, antara gandhara, shuddha madhyamam and panchamam in ascending scale, with kaisiki nishadham, chathusruthi dhaivatham and chathusruthi rishabham included in descending scale while the panchamam is dropped from the same. For the details of the notations and terms, see swaras in Carnatic music.

Popular compositions
There are a few compositions set to Navarasa kannada rāgam, which became popular due to the compositions of Tyagaraja. Here are some popular kritis composed in this scale.

Ninnu vinaa naama dendu and Paluku kanta composed by Tyagaraja in Telugu
Naan oru vilayaattu by Papanasam Sivan in Tamil
Vande Sada Padmanabham by Swathi Thirunal in Sanskrit
Durga Devi Durita Nivarini By Muthiah Bhagavatar in Kannada

Notes

References

Janya ragas